Anthony Randazzo (born 7 October 1966) is the bishop of the Roman Catholic Diocese of Broken Bay. He was previously an auxiliary bishop of the Roman Catholic Archdiocese of Sydney. He was consecrated by Archbishop Anthony Fisher at St Mary's Cathedral, Sydney on 24 August 2016.

Early life
Anthony Randazzo was born on 7 October 1966 in Sydney, the son of Colin Randazzo and his wife Caterina Di Losa from Lipari, Italy. His parents worked as fruiterers in their family business at Bankstown until relocating to Coolangatta on the Gold Coast in 1967. He is the third of four children; he has three sisters. Randazzo was educated at Saint Augustine's School in Coolangatta, Guardian Angels School in Southport and Aquinas College in Southport.

Priesthood
In 1985, Randazzo commenced his formation for priesthood at Pius XII Seminary, Banyo. Having ministered as a deacon at All Saints Parish Albany Creek, he was ordained priest on 29 November 1991 at the Cathedral of St Stephen, Brisbane by Archbishop Francis Roberts Rush. From 1992 to 1994, he was a curate at Saint Mary's Parish Ipswich, and from 1995 to 1997 he served as Master of Ceremonies at the cathedral in Brisbane. In 1998 Randazzo was sent to Rome where he undertook studies in Canon Law at the Pontifical Gregorian University. Upon his return to Brisbane in 2001, he was appointed pastor of Regina Caeli Parish Coorparoo Heights, Associate Judicial Vicar at the Regional Tribunal and Director of Vocations for the Archdiocese of Brisbane.

In 2004, Randazzo was called to Rome where he worked in the Congregation for the Doctrine of the Faith for five years. He returned to Australia and from 2009 until 2015 he was Rector of the Holy Spirit Seminary of Queensland. In the first semester of 2016, he was given sabbatical leave for studies in sacred scripture in Jerusalem.

Episcopacy
Randazzo was appointed on 24 June 2016, along with Richard Umbers, by Pope Francis to be a new auxiliary bishop of the Archdiocese of Sydney. He was consecrated and installed on 24 August 2016 at St Mary's Cathedral, Sydney by Archbishop Anthony Fisher.
He was appointed Bishop-Elect of Broken Bay Diocese by Pope Francis, on Monday 7 October 2019.  His installation took place in November 2019.

References

External links

21st-century Roman Catholic bishops in Australia
Roman Catholic bishops of Broken Bay
Australian people of Italian descent
Living people
1966 births
Clergy from Sydney
Roman Catholic bishops of Sydney